Guerrero Municipality may refer to:
 Guerrero Municipality, Chihuahua
 Guerrero Municipality, Coahuila
 Guerrero Municipality, Tamaulipas

Municipality name disambiguation pages